Edward Clancy may refer to:
 Edward Clancy (cardinal) (1923–2014), Australian Roman Catholic
 Edward J. Clancy Jr., American mayor of Lynn, Massachusetts
 Ed Clancy (born 1985), British bicycle racer
 Ed and Betty Clancy, co-founders of the Clancy's, a famous restaurant in New Orleans

See also
 Bill Clancy (William Edward Clancy, 1879–1948), baseball player
 Clancy (disambiguation)
 Edward (disambiguation)